Pago Park Soccer Stadium is a soccer stadium in Pago Pago, American Samoa. The capacity is 2,000.

The stadium is the home ground of the American Samoa national football team. It featured in the highly rated 2014 film Next Goal Wins, which documents the team's attempt to achieve their first-ever international win. The stadium is shown to be the team's training ground in the build-up to the 2011 Pacific Games and the 2014 World Cup Qualifiers.

Stands

The stadium has one small covered stand on the north side of the pitch, which is in-line with the half-way line.

Club football

The stadium is used for all games in the FFAS Senior League, the top-tier of American Samoan football. It has been used to host OFC Champions League matches.

2009 tsunami

The FIFA Goal Project had enabled a new pitch and new administration offices to be constructed in 2007, but the stadium was severely damaged by a tsunami in 2009. After undergoing a rebuilding project, the stadium was re-opened by FIFA President Sepp Blatter in a ceremony in January 2011.

References

External links
Pago Park Soccer Stadium, Soccerway.com

Football venues in American Samoa
Pago Pago